Maiden Lane may refer to:

Places

England
 Maiden Lane, Covent Garden, a street in London
 Maiden Lane Estate, a housing estate in London
 Maiden Lane railway stations, two closed stations near  Maiden Lane in London
 York Way, a street in London formerly called Maiden Lane

United States
 Maiden Lane (Manhattan), a street in New York City
 Maiden Lane (San Francisco), a street in San Francisco
 Maiden Lane Bridge, the namesake of Maiden Lane in Albany, New York
 Maiden Lane Historic District, the namesake of Maiden Lane in Raleigh, North Carolina

Other uses
 Maiden Lane, any one of three limited liability companies created by the Federal Reserve Bank of New York in the Maiden Lane Transactions
15 Maiden Lane, a film set in the neighborhood of New York City's Maiden Lane